Green Town (Urdu, Shahrak-e-Sabz) is a neighbourhood and union council (UC 139) located in Nishtar Tehsil of Lahore, Punjab, Pakistan.

References 

Nishtar Town